Lipůvka is a municipality and village in Blansko District in the South Moravian Region of the Czech Republic. It has about 1,400 inhabitants.

Notable people
Slavomír Bartoň (1926–2004), ice hockey player

References

Villages in Blansko District